Andrés Minelli (born 22 March 1971) is an Argentine swimmer. He competed in two events at the 1992 Summer Olympics.

References

1971 births
Living people
Argentine male swimmers
Olympic swimmers of Argentina
Swimmers at the 1992 Summer Olympics
Place of birth missing (living people)
20th-century Argentine people